Neil William Campbell, CM (September 3, 1930 in Buffalo, New York – August 11, 2006) was a Canadian rower. Born in Buffalo, his parents moved to St. Catharines, Ontario, when Campbell was around one year old. He started his rowing career with the St. Catharines Rowing Club in 1952, as a heavyweight oarsman. He competed in the Coxless Four at the 1964 Summer Olympics, and the Eight at the 1968 Summer Olympics.

In 1967 he became head Rowing coach at Ridley College, St. Catharines, Ontario, a position he held until 1987.  Under his mentoring Ridley eights won 14 Canadian Secondary School Rowing Association (formerly Canadian Schoolboy) Championships, as well as five American Schoolboy titles and seven Championships at the English Henley Royal Regatta. In 1985, Campbell coached the University of Cambridge's rowing team in preparation for its annual University Boat Race against the University of Oxford.

Campbell led the 1984 Canadian men's heavyweight crew to a gold medal at the 1984 Summer Olympics in Los Angeles. His crew later presented him with a replica gold medal.

In 2017, the St. Catharines Rowing Club christened a new boat in Campbell's honour.

On August 5, 2019, during the opening ceremony of the 137th Royal Canadian Henley Regatta, Campbell was inducted into the Canadian Rowing Hall of Fame.

Honours
 1981, Order of Canada
 1987, Canadian Olympic Hall of Fame
 2019, Canadian Rowing Hall of Fame

References

1931 births
2006 deaths
American emigrants to Canada
Canadian male rowers
Canadian people of Scottish descent
Canadian sports coaches
Members of the Order of Canada
Olympic rowers of Canada
People with acquired Canadian citizenship
Rowers at the 1964 Summer Olympics
Rowers at the 1968 Summer Olympics
Rowing coaches
Rowers from St. Catharines
Rowers from Buffalo, New York